The 2006 Paradise Jam was an early-season men's and women's college basketball tournament. The tournament, which began in 2000, was part of the 2006-07 NCAA Division I men's basketball season and 2006-07 NCAA Division I women's basketball season.  The tournament was played at the Sports and Fitness Center in Saint Thomas, U.S. Virgin Islands. Alabama won the men's tournament, in the women's tournament The Championship in the Saint Thomas Division was cancelled due to a family tragedy involving an Arizona State players family member. and Marquette won the Saint John Division.

Men's tournament 

Alabama faced Middle Tennessee in the first contest. Jermareo Davidson, the starting center for Alabama, was not with the team, due to the death of his girlfriend the prior week. Despite missing one of their top players, the Crimson Tide won 71–62. After a day off, Alabama faced Iowa. Alabama had only a one-point lead at halftime, but out scored Iowa by eleven in the second half to win 72–60. That win placed the Crimson Tide in the Championship game against Xavier, who had defeated Charleston and Villanova to also reach the finals. The game started as a repeat of the Alabama game against Iowa, with exactly the same halftime score of 32–31, Alabama outscored Xavier in the second half of the championship game and won 63–56. Alabama's Alonzo Gee was awarded Tournament MVP.

Bracket

Women's tournament 
Teams in the Saint Thomas division played in a 4 team tournament with a 3rd place game. Teams in the Saint John's division played a round robin, with each team playing each other on the 23rd, 24th and 25 November

Saint Thomas Division 
In the opening round, Arizona State beat Western Kentucky 67–63, while Rutgers beat Penn State 57–44. Arizona State was scheduled to play Rutgers, however, due to a family tragedy involving an Arizona State players family member, the game was cancelled. Western Kentucky beat Penn State 74–64 to earn the third place.

Saint John Division

References 

Paradise Jam Tournament
Paradise Jam
Paradise Jam